Kelly Arthur Anthon (born August 4, 1974) is a Republican  Idaho State Senator since 2015 representing District 27.

Early life and education
Anthon was born in Burley, Idaho. He was raised on a family farm near Declo, Idaho, attending public schools in Declo and graduating from Declo High School in 1992. He served as a missionary for the Church of Jesus Christ of Latter-day Saints in Japan, and later graduated from Brigham Young University with a Bachelor of Arts in anthropology in 1998 and from the University of Idaho College of Law in 2002 where he was also named the Bistline Scholar and student body president.  In 2017, Anthon completed training as a professional civil mediator at Pepperdine University.

Career 
Upon passing the Idaho bar exam, he worked as an attorney in private practice in Idaho's Mini-Cassia Area. In 2003 was appointed city attorney for Rupert, Minidoka, and Acequia. He also served as the City Attorney and Prosecutor for the City of Burley.   At the time of his first appointment, he was the youngest city attorney in Idaho.  In 2012, Anthon was hired as Rupert City Administrator.   Anthon also serves on the corporate board of directors of the Mart Group—a potato processing and marketing company.   In 2020, Anthon began teaching part time at the University of Idaho College of Law.

Idaho Senate
When 24-year incumbent Senator Dean Cameron resigned his seat for an appointment as the director of the Department of Insurance, the Legislative District 27 Republican Central Committee met to fill the vacancy in the Senate seat, sending three names in order of preference to Governor Butch Otter: Anthon, Doug Pickett of Oakley, and Wayne Hurst of Declo. Governor Otter appointed Anthon to serve the remainder of Cameron's term.  Anthon was subsequently elected in 2016 and reelected in 2018, 2020, and 2022.

Senate Leadership

After his first year in the Idaho Senate, Anthon was recognized as one of the 'Emerging Leaders' in the nation's state legislatures by The State Legislative Leaders Foundation. Idaho Senate Republicans elected Anthon in 2017 as the Majority Caucus Chairman—one of four Republican leadership positions in the Idaho State Senate.  In 2020, Anthon was elected as the Idaho Senate Majority Leader. He was re-elected Majority Leader in 2022.

Committee assignments
State Affairs Committee
Judiciary and Rules Committee

Anthon previously served on the Education Committee in 2016; he served on the Commerce Committee and the Health and Welfare Committees in 2017; he also served on the Local Government & Taxation Committee in 2018 through 2020.

Elections

Personal life
Anthon and his wife Joelle have 5 children. They reside in Declo, Idaho.

References

21st-century American politicians
Brigham Young University alumni
Idaho lawyers
Republican Party Idaho state senators
Living people
People from Burley, Idaho
People from Cassia County, Idaho
People from Rupert, Idaho
University of Idaho alumni
1974 births